Susan Sloane (born December 5, 1970) is a retired American professional tennis player. She was also known by her married name, Susan Sloane-Lundy.

Career
Sloane won seven national titles and three Kentucky state championships as a junior. As a teenager, she moved to train at the Nick Bollettieri Tennis Academy in Bradenton, Florida. She turned professional in 1986 and joined the WTA Tour. In 1988, she won the Virginia Slims of Nashville, her first and only singles title. She was runner-up at the same tournament in 1990. She achieved a career high ranking of World #19 on July 3, 1989. She posted career victories over Jo Durie, Sylvia Hanika, Carling Bassett, and Lori McNeil. She retired in 1993. She is the assistant director of tennis at Topseed Tennis Club.

WTA career finals

Singles: 2 (1-1)

References

External links
 
 

1970 births
Living people
American female tennis players
Sportspeople from Lexington, Kentucky
Tennis people from Kentucky
Sportswomen from Kentucky
21st-century American women